The Eigenmann family is a Filipino family of entertainers.

List of members

 Eddie Mesa 
 ∞ married Rosemarie Gil; they had three children
 Michael de Mesa 
 ∞ married Gina Alajar (first wife, annulled), had three children
 Ryan Eigenmann 
 AJ Eigenmann
 Geoff Eigenmann
 ∞ married Julie Reyes
 Mark Gil 
 with Irene Celebre fathered
 Gabby Eigenmann 
 Ira Eigenmann
 ∞ married actress Bing Pimentel (first wife, annulled), had two children
 Sid Lucero 
 Max Eigenmann
 with actress Jaclyn Jose fathered
 Andi Eigenmann
 with Jake Ejercito had
 Ellie
 with Philmar Alipayo, had two children: Keliana and Koa.
 Lilo
 Koa
 ∞ married Maricar Jacinto, they had one child: Stephanie.
 Cherie Gil
 ∞ married Rony Rogoff, they have two children: Bianca and Raphael.
 with Leo Martinez, they have one child: Jay.

References 

Eigenmann family
Show business families of the Philippines
Filipino families of Swiss ancestry
Filipino families of Spanish ancestry